The 1957 season marked the immediate return of Cherno More to the top flight of Bulgarian football after the club was dramatically relegated in 1955. The club started the season as SCNA Varna, Sport Club of the People's Army, but was renamed to Botev Varna in June 1957.

Overview

Background
Cherno More was relegated from A Group at the end of 1955, despite starting the season with 5 consecutive wins and finishing only three point off third place. The following year the team won the regional B group and booked a place for an end-of-the-season qualifying tournament played in Sofia in November 1956 to determine the last two teams to join A group in 1957. Competing were the five winners of the regional B groups and 11th-placed in A Group Zavod 12. Cherno More, competing as SCNA Varna, won a deciding match against Lokomotiv Plovdiv on 20 November 1956 to finish second.

Winless Streak
The team lost seven of the first 8 games, only drawing against Levski Sofia in Varna on 24 March 1957. Form improved somewhat in the following fixtures, but the Sailors remained winless after 15 matches of the 22 rounds season. With only six points gained and seven matches remaining, the club was bottom of the table and facing relegation for the second time in three years.

The Great Escape
The team, recently renamed Botev Varna midseason, achieved first win of the campaign in round 16 by defeating Botev Plovdiv 1-0 on 1 September 1957, giving supporters hope before a fixture break until mid-October. League football returned on October 13 with the 4-0 thrashing of Marek Stanke Dimitrov, followed by two more wins against city rivals Spartak and eventual runners-up Lokomotiv Sofia, denting their title hopes in the process. Botev Varna then drew against the dominant force of Bulgarian football and eventual league winners CDNA in Sofia, before securing survival with a game to spare by comfortably defeating Spartak Plovdiv 3-0 at home.

Republican Football Group A

Matches

League standings

Results summary

Bulgarian Cup

References

External links
 http://www.retro-football.bg/?q=bg/1957
 https://bulgarian-football.com/archive/1957/a-grupa.html
 http://a-pfg.com/%D1%81%D0%B5%D0%B7%D0%BE%D0%BD/1957/

PFC Cherno More Varna seasons
Cherno More Varna
Cherno More Varna